Pierbattista Pizzaballa  (born 21 April 1965) is an Italian prelate of the Catholic Church who has been the Latin Patriarch of Jerusalem since 6 November 2020.  A Franciscan friar, he had served as Custos of the Holy Land from 2004 to 2016, and as Apostolic Administrator of the Latin Patriarchate from 2016 to 2020.

Pizzaballa has a reputation for personal integrity and simplicity; much of his pastoral work has been with Hebrew speakers and he has close ties to Jewish leaders, while he has also been a vocal supporter of the Palestinians.

Early life and education 
Pierbattista Pizzaballa was born in Cologno al Serio, Bergamo, on 21 April 1965, son of Pietro and Maria Maddalena Tadini. He entered the Franciscan minor seminary in Bologna in September 1976 and on 5 September 1984 entered their novitiate in La Verna. He made his first vows there on 7 September 1985 and his perpetual vows in Bologna on 4 October 1989. He earned his bachelor’s degree in theology at the Pontifical University Antonianum and was ordained a priest on 15 September 1990, in the Cathedral of Bologna by Cardinal Giacomo Biffi.

He obtained his diploma in classical studies at the Archiepiscopal Seminary of Ferrara. He studied in Biblical Theology at the Studium Biblicum Franciscanum in Jerusalem in 1993 and then taught biblical Hebrew at the Franciscan Faculty of Biblical Science and Archeology in Jerusalem.

Besides his native Italian, Pizzaballa speaks Hebrew, English, and Arabic.

Presbyterate 
After completing his postgraduate studies, he taught Biblical Hebrew at the Franciscan Faculty of Biblical and archaeological sciences in Jerusalem, was responsible for the publication of the Roman Missal in Hebrew in 1995, and translated liturgical texts in Hebrew.

He joined the Franciscans working at the Custody of the Holy Land in July 1999 and was responsible for the pastoral care of Hebrew-speaking Catholics. On 9 May 2001, he was appointed Superior of the Convent of Saints Simeon and Anna in Jerusalem. From 2005 to 2008 he served as Patriarchal Vicar.

He was Custos of the Holy Land, that is, head of the Franciscan priory known as the Custody of the Holy Land, from May 2004 to April 2016, having been elected to a six-year term in May 2004, re-elected to a three-year term in March 2010, and reconfirmed for another three-year term in 2013.

In 2008 he was appointed a Consultor in the Commission for relations with Judaism of the Pontifical Council for Promoting Christian Unity.

In June 2014 Pope Francis entrusted Pizzaballa with organizing the peace prayer in the Vatican gardens, which brought together Israeli President Shimon Peres and Palestinian leader Mahmoud Abbas.

Episcopate
On 24 June 2016, Pope Francis nominated him Apostolic Administrator sede vacante of the Latin Patriarchate of Jerusalem and made him titular archbishop of Verbe. On 10 September 2016, he was consecrated bishop by Cardinal Leonardo Sandri, Archbishop Fouad Twal, and Bishop Francesco Beschi in the Bergamo Cathedral. The appointment of an Italian broke with tradition in that such posts are normally assigned to members of the ethnic group they predominantly serve, and his immediate predecessors had been a Palestinian and a Jordanian.

In 2016 Pizzaballa joined the Order of the Holy Sepulchre and became its Pro Grand Prior, and then Grand Prior upon appointment as Latin Patriarch. On 31 May 2017 he was appointed a member of the Congregation for the Oriental Churches.

On 24 October 2020, Pizzaballa was appointed Latin Patriarch of Jerusalem by Pope Francis. On 28 October 2020, Pope Francis bestowed Patriarch Pizzaballa with the pallium, a symbol of his authority as metropolitan archbishop and his unity with the pope. He took canonical possession of that see on 6 November 2020 in a private ceremony in the presence of Archbishop Leopoldo Girelli, Apostolic Delegate to Jerusalem, the Auxiliary Bishops of Jerusalem, and the Patriarchate's College of Consultors. 

He heads the Board of Directors of Caritas Jerusalem.

Distinctions 
 : Grand Prior and Knight of the Collar of the Order of the Holy Sepulchre
 : Conventual Chaplain Grand Cross ad honorem
 : Grand Officer of the Order of the Star of Italy
 Supreme Taxiarch of the Greek Orthodox Equestrian Order of the Holy Sepulchre

References

External links

Living people
1965 births
21st-century Italian Roman Catholic titular archbishops
Members of the Order of the Holy Sepulchre
Custodians of the Holy Land
Members of the Congregation for the Oriental Churches
Clergy from the Province of Bergamo
Italian Friars Minor
Franciscan bishops
Latin Patriarchs of Jerusalem